Scheffold is a German surname. Notable people with the surname include:

 Frank Scheffold (born 1969), German physicist
 Maria Scheffold (1912–1970), German chess master

German-language surnames